Shaan may refer to:

 Shaan (1980 film), an Indian Hindi film
 Shaan (2022 film), a Bangladeshi film
 Shaan (singer) (born 1972), Indian playback singer
 Ishaan Dev, Indian musical artist known as Shaan
 Shaan Hundal (born 1999), Canadian soccer player
 Shaan Rahman (born 1979), Indian composer and singer
 Shaan Shahid (born 1971), Pakistani film actor

See also
 Shan (disambiguation)